Curchod is a surname. Notable people with the surname include:

Louis Curchod (1826–1889), Swiss engineer and telegraph specialist
Suzanne Curchod (1737–1794), French-Swiss salonist and writer